Bodhai Yeri Budhi Maari is a 2019 Indian Tamil action thriller film written and directed by newcomer Chandru KR. The film stars  Dheeraj, Pradaini Surva, Radha Ravi, Mime Gopi, Charle and Dushara Vijayan.

Plot 
A man visits his friends a day before his wedding and ends up taking a potent drug. How does this change his life?

Cast 

Dheeraj as Karthik
Ajay as Commissioner Prasad
Radha Ravi as Karthik's father
'Mime' Gopi as Minister
Charle as Constable
Pradaini Surva as Brindha
Dushara Vijayan as Janani
Surekha Vani as Karthik's Sister
Roshan as Roshan
Arjunan as Joy
Meera Mithun as Roshan's girlfriend
Swaminathan as Janani's uncle
Sharath Ravi as Murali
Ashiq as Siddique
Lizzie Antony as Janani's mother

Production 
The film was announced by Sreenidhi Sagar of Rise East Entertainments Pvt Ltd, who liked the script and offered to produce the movie. The filming commenced in February 2019

Release 
A critic from The New Indian Express gave the film a rating of two-and-a half out of five and noted that "The tonal shift feels jarring and the overtly theatrical performances by the supporting actors don’t help either".

References

External links

2019 action thriller films
2010s Tamil-language films
Indian action thriller films
2019 films